Penelope "Penny" Hodge (1920 – July 5, 2016) was a Canadian office worker and activist.

Life and career 
The daughter of Martin Anderson, a Baptist preacher, and Alfaretta Berry, a teacher, she was born Penelope Anderson in Digby, Nova Scotia and grew up on a farm in Yarmouth. Hodge was educated at a segregated public school. After graduating from high school, she attended teacher's college in Truro. After two years of teaching, she was hired as a clerk by the National Research Council in Ottawa. After three years, she moved to Toronto; she worked briefly for the YWCA and then became a clerk at the Canadian Broadcasting Corporation, retiring in 1986.

Around 1952, she joined the Canadian Negro Women's Association (CANEWA), later the Congress of Black Women of Canada; she served as treasurer, then vice-president before becoming president in 1956. Hodge also provided administrative support for the Ontario Black History Society on a volunteer basis and served as historian for the First Baptist Church in Toronto.

She was married twice: first to Rupert Hodge and then to a Mr. LaVaughn.

In 2012, she received the Mary Matilda Winslow award from the Ontario Black History Society.

She died in hospital at the age of 96.

References 

1920 births
2016 deaths
Canadian civil rights activists
Women civil rights activists
Black Canadian women
African-Canadian feminism
Black Canadian activists